O'Shane is a patronymic Irish surname evolved from the given name Shane, a derivative of John, of Hebrew origin. O'Shane is uncommon as a given name.  People with the name O'Shane include:

 Pat O'Shane (born 1941), Australian magistrate
 Tjandamurra O'Shane (b. 1990), Indigenous Australian who was the victim of a racial attack at the age of six

Irish families